Peral is a freguesia (civil parish) of Cadaval Municipality, Portugal. The population in 2011 was 905, in an area of 16.46 km². One of its villages is Barreiras.

References

Parishes of Cadaval